Brian Alexander O'Kurley (born 7 March 1953) was a member of the House of Commons of Canada from 1988 to 1993. His background includes service in retail, education, Canadian Parliament, and administrative law.

Born in Lamont, Alberta, O'Kurley was elected in the Canadian federal election, 1988 federal election at the Elk Island electoral district for the Progressive Conservative party and served in the 34th Canadian Parliament.

From 2007 to 2017, Brian O'Kurley served as a Member of the Veterans Review and Appeal Board.  From 2017 to 2022 Brian O'Kurley served as a hearing chair and appeals commissioner for the Appeals Commission for Alberta Workers' Compensation.

Current life

O'Kurley currently resides in Ottawa, Ontario, Canada with his wife Bernadette. They have four children: Anthony, Joseph, Marissa, and Nicholas.

External links
 

1953 births
Living people
Members of the House of Commons of Canada from Alberta
Progressive Conservative Party of Canada MPs
People from Lamont, Alberta